Union of Translators of Russia (UTR) is a professional union of the translators, interpreters, teachers of translation and specialists in different genres and spheres of translation and interpreting.

UTR branches work in many regions of Russia (Astrakhan, Vladivostok, Volgograd, Voronezh, Ekaterinburg, Nizhni Tagil, Ivanovo, Irkutsk, Kazan, Kaliningrad, Kaluga, Krasnodar, Novorossisk, Sochi, Moscow, Moscow Region, Nizhni Novgorod, Novosibirsk, Orenburg, Perm, Ryazan, Rostov-on-Don, Samara, St. Petersburg, Saransk, Saratov, Smolensk, Stavropol, Tomsk, Tula (Russia), Ulyanovsk, Ufa, Khabarovsk, Chita, Yakutsk). UTR is a member of International Federation of Translators (FIT).

External links 
 Official site of the Union of Translators of Russia
 Official site of Sverdlovsk Region Branch of the Union of Translators of Russia
 Official site of Saint-Petersburg Branch of the Union of Translators of Russia
 Official site of Mordovian Branch of the Union of Translators of Russia, Saransk

Professional associations based in Russia
Translation associations